Newtonia hildebrandtii, the Lebombo wattle, is a medium-sized tree native to eastern Africa. It is a protected tree in South Africa.

Description

The trunk is usually rough, and the small branchlets and twigs are puberulous (densely covered with very short soft hairs) when young. There is usually a gland between each pair of pinnae.

Distribution and habitat
This tree is found in eastern Africa, its range extending from Kenya and Tanzania, through Malawi, Zimbabwe and Zambia, to Mozambique, Eswatini and KwaZulu-Natal in South Africa.

Uses
The timber of Newtonia hildebrandtii is used for building construction and for making poles and implements, and for carving. The wood burns well and makes good-quality charcoal. Products from the tree are also used in traditional medicine; an extract of the roots is used against worms, and an extract from the bark has been shown to have antimicrobial activity against a range of pathogens.

See also
List of Southern African indigenous trees

References

External links
 
 

hildebrandtii
Protected trees of South Africa
Plants described in 1880